Public Service Motivation (PSM) is an attribute of government and non-governmental organization (NGO) employment that explains why individuals have a desire to serve the public and link their personal actions with the overall public interest. Understanding the theory and practice of PSM is important in determining the motivations of individuals who choose careers in the government and non-profit sectors despite the potential for more financially lucrative careers in the private sector.

Common Models

How Public Service Motivation (PSM) is Used  
PSM helps employees get the most out of their job experience and is rapidly evolving to work towards employee goals and organizational needs effectively. Efforts to manage employee behavior within government organizations by focusing on financial rewards may not have the desired effect and could potentially have a negative impact on employee motivation and performance seeing as how those that do work in the public sector are usually not motivated by financial gain. According to Perry, PSM in today's society is more about focusing on employee commitment to an organization rather than benefits of a higher salary. One way PSM output can be measured is by team performance which encourages individuals to engage in behaviors that are best for the team's success and productivity. Performance can be measured in different categories and various outcomes can be utilized in order to help the organization set goals and interpret the results to tweak their motivational techniques. One area or aspect of management that relies heavily on motivation is when an organization or company determines how to distribute rewards to employees. Gottfredson emphasized that rewards may be the most important tool that business leaders have to coordinate and motivate team members with the idea that rewards can be monetary or promotional, but motivation plays a key part in how hard employees will work to receive rewards.

Perry’s Public Service Motivation Scale 
Public Service Motivation serves to provide the general public with an idea of what motivates individuals to choose career paths within the public sector as opposed to the private. Previous research emphasized that PSM was influenced by various social and political factors that ultimately drive employees to take an interest in the public sector. The history and concept of public service motivation has been studied by authors who contributed to the understanding of the practice itself such as Perry and Wise who coined the term PSM in 1990, and other political figures such as Woodrow Wilson who founded the field of Public Administration. Perry and Wise stated that PSM is often influenced by various social, political, and institutional factors and failure on the organization's part to recognize the motivation of its employees could lead to the discouragement of such individuals from the public sector.

Mission Valence 
Mission Valence can be viewed as an employee's perception of the attractiveness or salience of an organization's purpose or social contribution. Mission Valence is a concept formulated by Rainey and Steinbauer in 1999 that serves to provide a better understanding of what compels an employee to uphold and achieve goals within their organization. Mission Valence enhances the satisfaction that an individual experiences or anticipates to receive from advancing the organizational mission, and in turn, it has the "potential to influence the ability of the organization to recruit, retain, and motivate its employees." Ultimately, linking the organization's mission to the values and characteristics of the employee can increase the potential effects of PSM as members of the organization become committed to its success. Rainey and Steinbauer attribute mission valence to enhancing the satisfaction of an employee when the organization's mission or goal is achieved thus giving the employer the ability to motivate his or her employees and seek their retention. With the desire to help others, public employees are more likely to seek employment within a public organization because the particular mission of that organization often aligns with their own personal values. Previous studies enhance the notion that leadership along with effective management can increase employee mission valence through its ability to promote public service motivation.

Transformational Leadership 

Transformational leadership moves away from a traditional management perspective that is based on self-interest and the exchanging of rewards for positive performance, and instead proposes the ideology of value based leadership to inspire and thus motivate employees. Although value based leadership is not new to the scope of public management, it is important to understand the evolution of how employers communicate the vision of the organization's purpose to their employees. Transformational leadership can motivate employees by appealing to their ideals and moral values, which in turn leads to a more effective and meaningful work environment. Transformational leaders create shared organizational value through "inspirational communication, ongoing practices, setting meaningful goals and designating significant work." Paarlberg and Lavigna exclaim that linking transformational leadership and public service motivation to human resource management strategies will not radically improve the outcome of the workplace, but rather steadily transform management practices to garner the best organizational outcome to better motivate public sector employees.

The Role of Organizations in Promoting PSM 
The impact of organizational institutions can either have a positive or negative ramifications on the motivational attitude of employees. According to Perry and Wise, whose theories contributed to the understanding of the ongoing relationship between one's overall motivation and the public interest, provided the widely accepted definition of PSM as an individual's "predisposition to respond to motives grounded primarily or uniquely in public institutions and organizations." Under this definition, organizations have the duty and responsibility to foster an environment that allows employees to feel as if they are able to contribute to the general welfare of the public and can achieve their goals. Various scholars and researchers emphasize the role of organizations as an important aspect of PSM and indicate several factors that face employees on a regular basis that could either promote or hinder PSM. Perry and Wise specify those factors of an organization that influence PSM to include culture within an organization which can negatively be associated with PSM as hierarchical cultures tend to emphasize rule-based control of employees and bureaucratic personality, employees that experience red tape who often are characterized with lower levels of PSM as red tape includes rules regulations, and procedures that remain in force and entail a compliance burden, but do not advance the legitimate purposes the rules were intended to serve. Employees who had a lower level of job satisfaction were reported as more willing to tolerate red tape as opposed to those employees characterized with higher levels of PSM who were frustrated with the limitations of such constrictions. Educational level of organizational members reportedly had a positive relationship on the overall level of PSM of the individual. Wright, Pandey, and Moynihan emphasize that it is vital that organizational leaders understand the various factors that affect PSM in order help employees achieve their goals within the organization and provide for a better work environment.

Studies

Fields 
Early authors in the field of public administration described differences between public and private employees and concerns over motivating public sector employees. Paul Van Riper described the issue in his 1952 history of the U.S. civil service system.  Even Woodrow Wilson's seminal 1887 essay that founded the field of Public Administration expressed concern over the performance of civil servants.  Much of Max Weber's work on bureaucracy focused on similar issues. Kaufman's The Forest Ranger introduced the idea of an organizational culture unique to government employees in the 1960s, which contributed significantly to the field of study.

Formulation 
The concept of Public Service Motivation was formalized in the late 1970s and early 1980s by authors like Buchanan, Mosher, Perry, Porter, and Rainey; but the term was officially coined by Perry and Wise in 1990. Since then, PSM has gained international prominence from various scholars and  researchers.  PSM varies between employees, making it difficult to generalize the motivations of each individual who works in the public sector. Studies by Homberg, McCarthy, and Tabvuma attribute PSM to the positive impact on job satisfaction in the public sector because public employment helps satisfy individuals’ pro-social needs. Previous authors that are familiar with motivational factors associated with the public sector suggests that many employees tend to characterize themselves with pro-social identities such as caring and compassionate. Researchers of motivational theory and management emphasize that individuals will go above and beyond to be viewed as "moral" or good by their peers and fellow employees, so finding pro-social ways to motivate individuals can be beneficial.

Crewson argued that a responsive and cost-effective government should acknowledge that a failure to properly understand the motivations of public employees may have undesirable short term effects such as low job performance which may lead to long term effects such as the permanent displacement of the public service ethic.

Rosenblatt noted that there is a surprising link between PSM and motivation. After closely observing employees in the public section, material indicated that when PSM encourages individuals it can spark innovation. When employees are rewarded for previous accomplishments in the workplace, they are motivated to do even more, although that motivation is not necessarily coming from a genuine place and instead comes from the desire to receive more rewards. Rosenblatt reaffirms the notion that individuals aren't to concern themselves with what their driving force for may be, whether they are making accomplishments because they want to be innovative or because they want to receive a bonus, the ends will ultimately justify the means.

Factors 
Mann conducted a study among non profit employees and came to the conclusion that although there is a dichotomy within the public and private sectors, if an employee is working for a non profit organization he or she would be satisfied regardless of PSM or not. The reason behind this behavior is because employees who work for non profits already have a passion for the work that they do. According to Mann's study, even if these individuals didn't receive compensation, they would return to work the next day and work just as hard because they have intrinsic motivation that doesn't need to be externalized.

Previous scholars and researchers warn that PSM can also be influenced by negative factors such as institutionalized values, routinization of behaviors and skepticism about the value of the particular bureaucracy's effectiveness in promoting the public good. Budget maximization and "empire building"  were also scrutinized by Downs and Niskanen.

Criticism and Alternatives

Leadership Practices 
The agency's mission, goals, and objectives can help improve employee performance and motivation. Many employees who hold jobs within the public sector and non-profit organizations do not receive large salaries. It is important for an organization to motivate its employees and align their values and characteristics with the mission and values of the agency rather than subject employees to a stressful and hostile work environment motivated by financial gain. Leadership practices should emphasize to employees the importance of motivation and involvement which can ultimately help the agency or organization in the hiring and retention process if they are aware of the motives of their employees.

Surface Acting 
Studies performed by various researchers attribute an individual's motivation with the individual level of stress and job dissatisfaction. These factors can lead to surface acting which is characterized by adjusting observable emotional expressions to mask true feelings, pretending to feel a desired emotion, and faking emotional displays. It is hard to evaluate the motivation of each individual working in the public sector when they exhibit a false persona. Representing an agency or organization in the public sector often requires one to display and act in a certain behavior and attitude. This behavior often leads to surface acting.

Emotional Labor 
Situational factors such as the frequency of customer interactions, the duration of such interactions, career fields, customer hostility, and organizational expectations can all contribute to one's emotional labor. Emotional labor is the act of behaving or displaying specific emotions and behaviors within one's job profession. Employees are constantly under the influence of interactions between other employees and customers. Many citizens expect a certain level of satisfaction from each level of government which often burdens the employee with an immense amount of pressure to fulfill those expectations and who in turn will often face backlash and harsh criticism when citizens feel they are not satisfied.

Employment Relationship 
If an employee finds themselves in a hostile, stressful work environment this can deter motivation and counteract productivity which can ultimately effect the individuals  goals, expectations, and disrupt the balance of the workplace. Motivation stems from an individuals desire to satisfy the needs for automaton, direct communication between employees, and asocial inclusions. Having an open approach in the workplace can help new less experienced employees feel a sense of involvement and value which an ultimately increase their motivation to succeed and continue with the organization and vie for its success. As generational changes continue to occur and public sector employees rotate between positions, it is vital to understand how employment relationships can be improved in order to increase public service motivation. Nonprofit employees are becoming more similar to public employees based on motivational aspects such as intrinsic rewards.

See also
Altruism
Bureaucracy
Public Service
New Public Management 
Public Sector
Civil Service 
Government Agency
Emotional Labor
Emotion Work
Customer Relationship Management

Notes and references

Public administration
Human resource management
Altruism